Amino acid permeases are membrane permeases involved in the transport of amino acids into the cell. A number of such proteins have been found to be evolutionary related. These proteins contain 12 transmembrane segments.

See also
Amino acid transporter

Human proteins containing this domain 
CIP1;      SLC12A1;   SLC12A2;   SLC12A3;   SLC12A4;   SLC12A5;   SLC12A6;   SLC12A7;   
SLC12A8;   SLC12A9;   SLC7A1;    SLC7A10;   SLC7A11;   SLC7A13;   SLC7A14;   SLC7A2;    
SLC7A3;    SLC7A4;    SLC7A5;    SLC7A6;    SLC7A7;    SLC7A8;    SLC7A9;

References

Protein domains
Protein families
Membrane proteins